Leopold Morse (August 15, 1831 – December 15, 1892) was a United States representative from Massachusetts.

Biography
Morse was born in Wachenheim, Bavaria, in the German Confederation, the son of Charlotte (Mehlinger) and Jacob Morse. His family was Jewish. He attended the common schools in Wachenheim. He immigrated to the United States in 1849 and resided for about a year in Sandwich, New Hampshire.

He moved to Boston, Massachusetts and worked in a clothing store, which he later purchased and operated until his death.

About 1850 Morse opened a clothing store in New Bedford, Massachusetts.

Morse was a delegate to the Democratic National Convention in 1876 and 1880. He was an unsuccessful Democratic candidate in 1870 and 1872 for election to the Forty-second and Forty-third Congresses. The Boston Globe later noted that "few men step, as he did, from private station, immediately upon the floor of Congress, and he [had] never gone before the people except as a candidate for membership in that body". He was elected to the Forty-fifth and to the three succeeding Congresses (March 4, 1877 - March 3, 1885). He served as chairman of the Committee on Expenditures in the Department of the Navy (Forty-eighth Congress). He declined to accept a renomination in 1884. Morse was elected president of the Post Publishing Co. publisher of The Boston Post, in that year. He returned to elected office as a Representative to the Fiftieth Congress (March 4, 1887 - March 3, 1889). He served as chairman of the U.S. House Committee on Expenditures in the Department of State for the Congress.

Morse was not a candidate for renomination in 1888. He resumed business activities, and died in Boston on December 15, 1892.

Morse was interred in Mount Auburn Cemetery in Cambridge.

Morse's brother was lawyer Godfrey Morse.

See also 
List of Jewish members of the United States Congress

References

External links

German emigrants to the United States
Jewish members of the United States House of Representatives
1831 births
1892 deaths
Burials at Mount Auburn Cemetery
Democratic Party members of the United States House of Representatives from Massachusetts
19th-century American politicians
The Boston Post people